Otukaia is a genus of medium-sized sea snails, marine gastropod molluscs in the family Calliostomatidae, the top shells. Otukaia has long been considered a subgenus of Calliostoma and is still treated as such by many authorities.

Snails in this genus are characterized by their relatively large, silky-white, thin shell. They lack an umbilicus. Their spiral whorls are flat to slightly convex. The first three spiral cords can show some sculpture that may persist on later whorls. They have a rachidian radula. They can be found worldwide in deep water.

Some authors use Otukaia Ikebe, 1942 as a subgenus in Calliostoma Swainson, 1840.

The (sub)generic name Otukaia is in honor of the Japanese malacologist Yanosuke Otuka (1903–1950), who described the type species Calliostoma kiheiziebisu Otuka, 1939.

Species 
The following species are accepted in the genus Otukaia:

 Otukaia beringensis Tuskes & R. Clark, 2018
 Otukaia ikukoae Sakurai, 1994
 Otukaia kiheiziebisu (Otuka, 1939)

Species brought into synonymy
Otukaia blacki Dell, 1956, accepted as Maurea alertae (B. A. Marshall, 1995)
Otukaia chilena (Rehder, 1971), accepted as Maurea chilena (Rehder, 1971)
Otukaia crustulum Vilvens & Sellanes, 2006, accepted as Calliotropis crustulum (Vilvens & Sellanes, 2006)
Otukaia delli McLean & Andrade, 1982, accepted as Maurea delli (McLean & Andrade, 1982)
Otukaia eltanini  Dell, 1990,  accepted as Maurea eltanini (Dell, 1990)
Otukaia rossica (Dall, 1919), accepted as Margarites rossicus Dall, 1919

References

 
Calliostomatidae